BDM may refer to:

Arts and entertainment 
 Berkeley Dance Marathon, an annual benefit for the Elizabeth Glaser Pediatric AIDS Foundation hosted at University of California, Berkeley
 Big Damn Movie, referring to the movie Serenity by Joss Whedon
 The Black Dahlia Murder (band), an American extreme metal band from Michigan
 Brutal death metal, a subgenre of death metal music
 Blackened death metal, a subgenre of black metal music

Government and politics 
 Civil registration of Births, Deaths and Marriages in the UK and many Commonwealth countries, with records usually held by the General Register Office
 Bund Deutscher Mädel (League of German Girls), a girls' organisation in Nazi Germany

Business 
 Braddock Dunn & McDonald, a longtime defense contractor of 7000 employees purchased by TRW Inc in the mid-1990s
 Business decision mapping, a technique for making decisions of the kind that often need to be made in business
 Business development manager, a job-title for commercial employees that aim to increase company size, revenue, and profits by leveraging Business Intelligence, technology, partnerships, sales, and marketing.
 BDM (aircraft constructor), a French aircraft constructor/designer; see List of aircraft (B–Be)

People 
 Brian David-Marshall, a writer about Magic: The Gathering
 Bruce Bueno de Mesquita, noted political scientist at New York University

Science, medicine and technology 
 Background debug mode interface, a programming interface to embedded systems microcontrollers like JTAG
 2,3-Butanedione monoxime, an organic compound also known as diacetyl monoxime
 Browning BDM, the "Browning Dual Mode" automatic pistol made by Browning
 M141 Bunker Defeat Munition, a modern weapon
 Bateson–Dobzhansky–Muller model, a model of evolutionary speciation
 Becker-DeGroot-Marschak method, a method of measuring willingness-to-pay in experimental economics
 Biodiversity Monitoring Switzerland

Transport
 Bedford railway station, Bedfordshire, England, National Rail station code BDM

game
 Black desert mobile